San Pietro Infine is a comune (municipality) in the Province of Caserta in the Italian region Campania, located about  northwest of Naples and about  northwest of Caserta. San Pietro Infine borders the following municipalities: Mignano Monte Lungo, San Vittore del Lazio, Venafro.

History
The area was contented by the Oscans and the Samnites in the 3rd century BC and was colonized by the Romans during the Third Samnite War. The burgh itself has medieval origins and was part of the territories of the Abbey of Monte Cassino.

The town was the site of a major military engagement in World War II and, thus, the subject of a well-known war-time documentary about that battle, The Battle of San Pietro, directed by John Huston. The modern town is actually a rebuilt version, with the older and original town — a few hundred meters away — having been totally destroyed in the war.

Main sights
Church of San Michele, with a 16th-century portal.
Arch of the Barons, in Gothic style. It was probably the entrance of an ancient castle.
Church of Madonna of the Water.

References

External links
 Official website

Cities and towns in Campania